Erik Magnus Lindberg (21 May 1952 – 26 February 2019) was a Swedish musician, singer and composer.

References 

1952 births
2019 deaths
Swedish male musicians
Deaths from cancer in Sweden